Vaclav Zizler, Ph.D., Dr.Sc. (born 8 March 1943), is a Czech mathematics professor specializing in Banach space theory and non-linear spaces. As of 2006, Dr. Zizler holds the position of Professor Emeritus at the University of Alberta in Edmonton, Alberta, Canada. Formerly he was at the Mathematical Institute of the Czech Academy of Sciences where he was Head of Research. In 2001 the Czech Minister of Education named his Functional Analysis and Infinite Dimensional Geometry the university textbook of the year. In 2008 he was, for his excellent lifelong work in mathematical analysis and selfless activities in favour of the Czech mathematics, awarded a laureate medal by the Czech Mathematical Society.

Selected publications
Books
.
.

Research articles
.
.

References

External links
Zizler's homepage at the University of Alberta.

Canadian mathematicians
Czech expatriates in Canada
Czech mathematicians
Academic staff of the University of Alberta
1943 births
Living people
Place of birth missing (living people)